You Can't Stop Me is the fourth studio album by American deathcore band Suicide Silence. It was released in the UK on July 14, 2014 and in North America on July 15 by Nuclear Blast. It is the first album featuring vocalist Hernan "Eddie" Hermida, and the first album without original lead vocalist Mitch Lucker, who died in 2012.

Album title
The album title and title track come from a set of lyrics that Mitch Lucker wrote before he died. The song's music video was released on July 1, 2014.

Singles
On May 6, 2014, the song "Cease to Exist" was released as the first single from the album, and was made available for purchase on iTunes. The lyric video to "Cease to Exist" was released on Nuclear Blast's YouTube channel the same day. The second single from the album, "Don't Die", was released on June 12, 2014.

Track listing

Notes
2000 copies of the album (1000 standard and 1000 deluxe) contained the hidden track "Dogma: I Am God", which starts at 4:20 of "Ouroboros".

Personnel
Suicide Silence
 Hernan "Eddie" Hermida – vocals
 Chris Garza – guitars
 Mark Heylmun – guitars
 Dan Kenny – bass
 Alex Lopez – drums

Additional personnel
 George "Corpsegrinder" Fisher – additional vocals on "Control"
 Greg Puciato – additional vocals on "Monster Within"
 Steve Evetts – production

References

Suicide Silence albums
2014 albums
Nuclear Blast albums
Albums produced by Steve Evetts